Arsalan Iftikhar Chaudhry (b. 1980 in Quetta, Balochistan) is a Pakistani businessman and medical doctor. He is a son of the former  Chief Justice of Pakistan Iftikhar Muhammad Chaudhry. He was notably involved in the Mediagate controversy in 2012.

Selection using the Quota System

Arsalan Iftikhar Chaudhry, son of former  Chief Justice of Pakistan Iftikhar Muhammad Chaudhry, in spite of receiving a C grade (third division) in High School (Intermediate) was admitted to Bolan Medical College on the quota reserved for the Chief Minister of Balochistan. Chaudhry was a medical officer within a month of graduation and was promoted as a section officer in the Department of Health of Government of Balochistan shortly thereafter. Arsalan Iftikhar Chaudhry has not yet decided to go on to practice medicine.

Corruption charges

Malik Riaz Hussain, a real estate investor who founded and owns Bahria Town, was approached by an intermediary of Arsalan Iftikhar Chaudhry, son of Chief Justice Iftikhar Muhammad Chaudhry, that he had inside information and a case and it can be resolved in his favour. Malik Riaz Hussain in an official deposition produced itemised list of how he bankrolled a playboy lifestyle for the son of the country's top judge. Arsalan Iftikhar Chaudhry had allegedly promised to influence his father's rulings.

Arsalan Iftikhar Chaudhry, son of Chief Justice Iftikhar Muhammad Chaudhry, resigned on 3 July 2014 from his post as Vice Chairman of Balochistan Board of Investment. The appointment was being criticized heavily by the media and opposition parties. His appointment was also being linked to the alleged role of the former Chief Justice of Pakistan, Iftikhar Muhammad Chaudhry, in the alleged rigging of General Elections 2013.

Arsalan Iftikhar had accused Imran Khan saying that he was hiding certain information about himself  to contest General Election 2013; therefore, his credibility as member of national assembly was doubtful.

See also
 Balochistan Board of Investment
 Malik Riaz Hussain
 Imran Khan

External links
 Arsalan Iftikhar's resignation
 Arsalan Iftikhar bows to public pressure, resigns
 Ex-CJP Iftikhar jumps into foray; locks horns with Imran Khan
 How the Arsalan Iftikhar case affected Bahria Town

References

1980 births
Businesspeople from Balochistan, Pakistan
Living people
Pakistani healthcare managers
People from Quetta
Legal history of Pakistan
Punjabi people